The Hoftoren (Court Tower), nicknamed De Vulpen (The Fountain Pen) is a 29-storey,  building in The Hague, Netherlands. It is the third-tallest building in the city, and the eighth-tallest in the country. The Hoftoren was designed by Kohn Pedersen Fox Associates (KPF) in New York City, and built by Heijmans Bouw BV, and is home to the Ministry of Education, Culture and Science and the Ministry of Health, Welfare and Sport (the latter having taken up temporary residence in the Hoftoren in 2012) of the Netherlands.

References

Skyscrapers in The Hague
Skyscraper office buildings in the Netherlands
Government buildings completed in 2003
Kohn Pedersen Fox buildings